Stefan Perić (born 13 February 1997) is an Austrian footballer who plays as a defender for Croatian club HNK Šibenik. His parents emigrated from Bosnia and Herzegovina to Austria.

Club career
On 25 July 2015 Perić played his first match for VfB Stuttgart II in the 3. Liga against Dynamo Dresden.

On 18 June 2021, he joined HNK Šibenik in Croatia.

References

External links 
 
 
 DFB.de profile
 

1997 births
Living people
Austrian footballers
Austria youth international footballers
Austria under-21 international footballers
Austrian expatriate footballers
Association football defenders
FC Liefering players
VfB Stuttgart II players
FC Wacker Innsbruck (2002) players
Wolfsberger AC players
HNK Šibenik players
3. Liga players
Regionalliga players
Austrian Football Bundesliga players
2. Liga (Austria) players
Austrian Regionalliga players
Croatian Football League players
Expatriate footballers in Germany
Expatriate footballers in Croatia
Austrian people of Serbian descent
Austrian expatriate sportspeople in Germany
Austrian expatriate sportspeople in Croatia
Footballers from Salzburg